Events from the year 1920 in Ireland.

Events
2 January – Irish Republican Army (IRA) volunteers of the 1st Cork Brigade (commanded by Mick Leahy) capture Carrigtwohill Royal Irish Constabulary (RIC) barracks, the first such attack carried out as official Republican policy.
27 February – the text of the Home Rule Bill to be introduced in the House of Commons of the United Kingdom is published. It provides for the establishment of a 128-member parliament in Dublin and a 52-member parliament in Belfast.
10 March – the Ulster Unionist Council accepts the Government's plan for a Parliament of Northern Ireland.
20 March – the Sinn Féin Lord Mayor of Cork (since January), Tomás Mac Curtain, is murdered by armed and disguised RIC men who break into his home.
22 March – thousands gather to pay their respects to the murdered Tomás Mac Curtain. Over 8,000 IRA Volunteers line the route to St. Finbarr's Cemetery. He is succeeded as Lord Mayor by Terence MacSwiney.
25 March – British recruits to the RIC begin to arrive in Ireland. They become known from their improvised uniforms as the "Black and Tans".
31 March – in the Second reading debate in the Parliament of the United Kingdom on the Government of Ireland Bill, Unionist leader Sir Edward Carson opposes the division of Ireland, seeing it as a betrayal of Unionists in the south and west.
2 April – Canadian-born lawyer Sir Hamar Greenwood, Bt, PC, KC, MP, is appointed Chief Secretary for Ireland.
5 April – IRA prisoners began the 1920 hunger strike in Mountjoy Prison, Dublin, demanding prisoner of war status.
13–14 April – Irish Trades Union Congress stages a general strike in support of the Mountjoy hunger strikers, securing their release.
15 April–8 June: Arthur Griffith establishes a Republican legal system (under Austin Stack) in areas under IRA control. The traditional Summer Assizes become virtually unworkable.
2 May – Viscount Fitzalan is sworn in as Lord Lieutenant of Ireland, the first Catholic to hold the viceroyalty since the reign of King James II.
10 May – forty Irish republican prisoners on hunger strike at HM Prison Wormwood Scrubs in London are released.
17 May – Sinn Féin supporters and Unionists engage in pitched street battles in Derry.
20 May – Dublin dock workers refuse to handle British military material, and are soon joined in the boycott by members of the Irish Transport and General Workers Union.
22 May – in Rome, Pope Benedict XV beatifies Oliver Plunkett.
4 June – the IRA orders a boycott of the RIC and their families.
17 June – "The Listowel Mutiny": RIC constables based at Listowel refuse orders to assist the British Army. The RIC is ordered to shoot armed IRA men who do not surrender when challenged.
20 June – five die in severe rioting in Ulster.
24 June – troops are sent to reinforce the Derry garrison.
29 June – Dáil Courts established to hear civil cases.
6 July – Kingstown Urban District Council resolves to revert to the town's historic name of Dún Laoghaire.
21 July – Protestants expel Catholic workers from the Harland and Wolff shipyard in Belfast. Referred to as the Belfast Pogrom.
23 July – fourteen die and one hundred are injured in fierce rioting in Belfast.
27 July – the first recruits – former British Army officers – join the RIC's Auxiliary Division.
31 July – Bishop Daniel Mannix is detained on board ship off Queenstown and prevented from landing in Ireland.
3 August – Catholic riots in Belfast in protest at the continuing British Army presence.
13 August – the Restoration of Order in Ireland Act receives Royal Assent, providing for Irish Republican Army activists to be tried by court-martial rather than by jury in criminal courts.
15 August – the town hall at Templemore is burned down during the disturbances.
19 August – following his conviction by court martial for sedition, the Lord Mayor of Cork, Terence MacSwiney, goes on hunger strike in Brixton Prison (London).
24 August – special constables are enrolled following rioting in Ulster.
20 September – "Sack of Balbriggan" in County Dublin: "Black and Tans" destroy more than fifty properties in the town.
28 September – there are disturbances at Mallow, County Cork, when a raid on a military barracks by Liam Lynch and Ernie O'Malley is followed by a sack of the town by British soldiers.
30 September – "Sack of Trim" in County Meath: "Black and Tans" destroy properties in the town following the previous day's raid on an RIC barracks by the IRA.
22 October – formation of the Ulster Special Constabulary, an armed (and predominantly Protestant) police reserve, is announced.
25 October – Terence MacSwiney, Lord Mayor of Cork, dies in Brixton Prison on the 74th day of his hunger strike.
31 October – Terence MacSwiney is buried in St. Finbarr's Cemetery in his native Cork City. Arthur Griffith delivers the graveside oration.
1 November – an 18-year-old medical student, Kevin Barry, is executed in Mountjoy Prison for participating in the killing of three young unarmed British soldiers.
12 November – a hunger strike in Cork Prison is called off after the Sinn Féin President, Arthur Griffith, intervenes.
21 November – Bloody Sunday: The Irish Republican Army, on the instructions of Michael Collins, shoot dead the "Cairo gang", fourteen British undercover agents in Dublin, most in their homes. Later this day in retaliation the Auxiliary Division of the Royal Irish Constabulary open fire on a crowd at a Gaelic Athletic Association Football match in Croke Park, killing thirteen spectators and one player and wounding 60. Three men are shot this night in Dublin Castle "while trying to escape".
22 November – IRA Captain Patrick McCarthy is shot dead during an ambush on "Black and Tans" at Millstreet.
28 November – Kilmichael Ambush: The flying column of the 3rd Cork Brigade IRA, led by Tom Barry, ambushes two lorries carrying Auxiliaries at Kilmichael, County Cork, killing seventeen (with three of its men also dying), which leads to official reprisals.
10 December – martial law is declared in Counties Cork, Kerry, Limerick and Tipperary.
23 December
Government of Ireland Act 1920, passed by the Parliament of the United Kingdom, receives Royal Assent from George V providing for the partition of Ireland into Northern Ireland and Southern Ireland with separate parliaments, granting a measure of home rule.
Éamon de Valera returns from attempting to secure support from the United States for the Irish Republic.

Arts and literature
 May – W. B. Yeats concludes a lecture tour (begun in October 1919) in the United States and returns to settle in Oxford. In this year also he publishes The Second Coming.
 10 August – La Scala Theatre and Opera House, Dublin, is opened as a cinema.
 Castleisland's Carnegie library is opened and destroyed by fire.
 Hamilton Harty becomes chief conductor of the Hallé Orchestra in Manchester.

Sport

Football

International
14 February  Ireland 2–2 Wales (in Belfast)
13 March  Scotland 3–0 Ireland (in Glasgow)
23 October  England 2–0 Ireland (in Sunderland)

Irish League
Winners: Belfast Celtic

Irish Cup
Winners: Shelbourne (final not played). Disorder at the other semi-final which is abandoned means both potential opponents are excluded from the competition and the Irish Football Association award the cup to Shelbourne.

Gaelic Games
The All-Ireland Champions are Dublin (hurling) and Tipperary (football)

Golf
British Ladies Amateur Golf Championship held at Royal County Down Golf Club (winner: Cecil Leitch)

Births
15 February – Bill Collins, footballer (died 2010).
7 March – Eilís Dillon, author (died 1994).
13 April – Liam Cosgrave, 5th Taoiseach and leader of Fine Gael (died 2017).
15 April - Jim McFadden, professional ice hockey player (died 2002)
30 April – Duncan Hamilton, motor racing driver (died 1994).
19 May – Joe Cahill, Chief of Staff of the Provisional Irish Republican Army (died 2004).
21 May
John V. Luce, classicist (died 2011).
James Plunkett, novelist, author of Strumpet City (died 2003).
22 May – Oliver J. Flanagan, Fine Gael TD and Cabinet Minister (died 1987).
27 May – Joseph Caprani, cricketer.
15 April – Jim McFadden, ice hockey player (died 2002).
2 June – Michael O'Hehir, sports commentator and journalist (died 1996).
5 June – Cornelius Ryan, journalist and author (died 1974).
12 June – Eoin Ryan, Fianna Fáil Seanad Éireann member (died 2001).
17 August – Maureen O'Hara, born Maureen FitzSimons, film actress (died 2015 in the United States).
21 August – Rinty Monaghan, boxer (died 1984).
27 August – James Molyneaux, Unionist politician and leader of the Ulster Unionist Party from 1979 to 1995 (died 2015).
12 October – Christy Ring, Cork hurler (died 1979).
16 October – Paddy Finucane, Royal Air Force fighter pilot, youngest Wing Commander in RAF history (killed in action 1942 over English Channel).
17 October – John Godley, 3rd Baron Kilbracken, author and journalist (died 2006).
18 October – Alec Cooke, Baron Cooke of Islandreagh, businessman and politician (died 2007).
24 October – Robert Greacen, poet (died 2008).
5 November – Tommy Murphy, Laois Gaelic footballer (died 1985).
8 November – Charles Mitchel, actor and television newsreader, reader of the first Telefís Éireann news bulletin in 1961 (died 1996).
25 November – Patrick J. Reynolds, Fine Gael TD and Senator, Cathaoirleach of Seanad Éireann 1983–1987 (died 2003).
10 December – Michael Russell, Bishop of Waterford and Lismore (1965–1993) (died 2009).
Full date unknown
Emma Groves, blinded by a rubber bullet in 1971, becomes a leading campaigner for banning the use of plastic bullets, co-founder of the United Campaign Against Plastic Bullets (died 2007).
Daniel O'Neill, painter (died 1974).

Deaths
24 January – Percy French, civil engineer, songwriter, entertainer and artist (born 1854).
20 March – Tomás Mac Curtain, Sinn Féin Lord Mayor of Cork, murdered on his 36th birthday by the Black and Tans (born 1884).
10 August – James O'Neill, actor, father of the American playwright Eugene O'Neill (born 1847).
11 August – Joe Murphy, member of Irish Republican Army, died on 76-day hunger strike during the Irish War of Independence (born 1895).
17 October – Michael Fitzgerald, Irish Republican Army member, died after 67 days Hunger strike at Cork Jail.
25 October – Terence MacSwiney, playwright and poet, member of 1st Dáil, Sinn Féin Lord Mayor of Cork, died on 74th day of hunger strike (born 1879).
1 November – Kevin Barry, executed for his part in an Irish Republican Army operation resulting in the deaths of three British soldiers (born 1902).
6 November – James Gildea, soldier and philanthropist, founded the Soldiers', Sailors' and Airmen's Families Association (born 1838).
9 November – Daniel Gallery, politician in Canada (born 1859).
21 November – Dick McKee, Irish Republican Army member in Easter Rising, shot by Crown forces (born 1893).
Full date unknown
George J. Gaskin, singer (born 1850s).
Denis Grimes, Limerick hurler (born 1864).
T. W. Rolleston, writer, poet and translator (born 1857).

References

 
1920s in Ireland
Ireland
Years of the 20th century in Ireland